Senator Alexander may refer to:

Adam Rankin Alexander (1781–1848), Tennessee State Senate
Archibald Alexander (politician) (1755–1822), Delaware State Senate
Betty Jean Alexander (born 1960s), Michigan State Senate
Ethel Skyles Alexander (1925–2016), Illinois State Senate
Frederick D. Alexander (1910–1980), North Carolina State Senate
J. D. Alexander (born 1959), Florida State Senate
John M. Alexander Jr. (born 1949), North Carolina State Senate
John Alexander (Ohio politician) (1777–1848), Ohio State Senate
Kenny Alexander (born 1966), Virginia State Senate
Lamar Alexander (born 1940), U.S. Senator from Tennessee from 2003 to 2021
Nathaniel Alexander (governor) (1756–1808), North Carolina State Senate
Sydenham Benoni Alexander (1840–1921), North Carolina State Senate
Thomas C. Alexander (born 1956), South Carolina State Senate
W. Ted Alexander (born 1960), North Carolina State Senate
William Cowper Alexander (1806–1874), New Jersey State Senate